Ravikanth Perepu is an Indian film director, screenwriter, and editor known for his works in Telugu cinema. Perepu won the state Nandi Award for Best Screenplay Writer for his directorial debut film Kshanam (2016).

Personal life
Perepu was born in Visakhapatnam, Andhra Pradesh, into a Telugu-speaking family, to Perepu Nageswara Rao and his wife. He did his schooling at Kotak Salesian School; Intermediate from Mega Junior College in Visakhapatnam; graduated in Chemical Engineering from Gayatri Vidya Parishad College of Engineering, Visakhapatnam.

Perepu married Veena Ghantasala, grand-daughter of singer, Ghantasala, in November 2017.

Career
Perepu had plans of becoming a blockbuster director from the age of 9, after watching Mani Ratnam's Alaipayuthey. He knew actor Adivi Sesh through Facebook and moved to Hyderabad in 2012, in the hopes of becoming a director. He worked as an assistant director on the 2013 romcom, Kiss, which was directed by Sesh himself.

Perepu debuted  thriller]], Kshanam, starring Sesh and Adah Sharma in the lead roles and Anasuya Bharadwaj, Vennela Kishore, Satyam Rajesh, and Satyadev Kancharana in supporting roles. It went on to become a sleeper hit, and made Sesh a household name, for thrillers, in Telugu cinema. 

After a gap of almost 4 years, his second directorial, Krishna and His Leela, came out in 2020. It was produced by Daggubati Suresh Babu and Viacom18 Studios. It starred Siddu Jonnalagadda, Shraddha Srinath, Seerat Kapoor, and Shalini Vadnikatti in the lead roles. It was released directly on Netflix, for steaming, due to the COVID-19 pandemic. Along with Siddu, he wrote the story and edited the film as well.

Filmography

Awards
Nandi Awards
2016: Best Screenplay Writer for Kshanam

References

Living people
Telugu film directors
Telugu screenwriters
Year of birth missing (living people)
Telugu film editors
Indian film directors
21st-century Indian film directors
Film directors from Andhra Pradesh
Film people from Andhra Pradesh
Indian male screenwriters
Screenwriters from Andhra Pradesh
Film editors from Andhra Pradesh
Indian film editors
People from Andhra Pradesh
People from Visakhapatnam
People from Visakhapatnam district